A salivary duct is a duct which brings saliva from a salivary gland to part of the digestive tract. In human anatomy there are:

 Parotid duct
 Submandibular duct
 Major sublingual duct